Naser Rugova is a Deputy of the Kosovo Assembly. He was born in 1970 in Crnce, Socialist Federal Republic of Yugoslavia.
He is a member of the Democratic League of Kosovo.

Notes

References

1970 births
Kosovo Albanians
Democratic League of Dardania politicians
Living people
People from Istog
Politicians from Peja